Rampur-Baghelan Assembly constituency is one of the 230 Vidhan Sabha (Legislative Assembly) constituencies of Madhya Pradesh state in central India. This constituency came into existence in 1951, as one of the 48 Vidhan Sabha constituencies of the erstwhile Vindhya Pradesh state. This constituency was abolished in 1961 but came into existence again in 1966.

Overview
Rampur-Baghelan (constituency number 67) is one of the 7 Vidhan Sabha constituencies located in Satna district. This constituency covers the entire Rampur-Baghelan tehsil and part of Amarpatan tehsil of the district.

Rampur-Baghelan is part of Satna Lok Sabha constituency along with six other Vidhan Sabha segments of this district, namely, Chitrakoot, Raigaon, Satna, Nagod, Maihar and Amarpatan.

Members of Legislative Assembly
As a constituency of Vindhya Pradesh:
 1951: Govind Narayan Singh, Indian National Congress 
As a constituency of Madhya Pradesh:
 1957: Govind Narayan Singh, Indian National Congress
 1962: Did not exist 
 1967: Govind Narayan Singh, Indian National Congress
 1972: Toshan Singh, Samyukta Socialist Party
 1977: Prabhakar Singh, Janata Party
 1980: Harsh Singh, Indian National Congress (I)
 1985: Harsh Singh, Indian National Congress
 1990: Toshan Singh, Janata Dal
 1993: Ram Lakhan Singh, Bahujan Samaj Party
 1998: Prabhakar Singh, Bharatiya Janata Party
 2003: Harsh Singh, Rashtriya Samanta Dal
 2008: Ram Lakhan Singh, Bahujan Samaj Party
 2013: Harsh Singh, Bharatiya Janata Party
 2018: Vikram Singh (Vikki), Bharatiya Janata Party

See also
 Rampur Baghelan

References

Satna district
Assembly constituencies of Madhya Pradesh